Ali Oumlil (born December 25, 1940) is a Moroccan philosopher, thinker, human rights activist, diplomat and political persona.

Early life and education

Oumlil was born in Kenitra, Morocco, in 1940. He entered the University of Cairo in 1955 to obtain his bachelor's degree in philosophy in 1960. He then attended the Sorbonne University to work on a doctorate with French scholar and Islamologist Roger Arnaldez focusing on Ibn Khaldun methodology. He completed his doctorate in 1977.

Career

Human rights

Oumlil started in 1962 as assistant professor of Contemporary Arab Thought at the Mohammed V University in Rabat, Morocco.
In 1979, Oumlil co-founded the Moroccan Association for Human Rights (AMDH) in Rabat, which he chaired until 1985. Oumlil went on to co-found the Moroccan Human Rights Organization (OMDH) in 1988 and served as its chairman from 1990 to 1993. 
He was also a co-founder and board member of the executive committee of the Arab Human Rights Institute in Tunis from 1986 to 1994.
In 1997-1999, Oumlil presided the Arab Organization for Human Rights in Cairo.

Think tank

In 1992, Ali Oumlil was elected Secretary General of the Board of Trustees of the Arab Thought Forum; a leading Pan-Arab think tank presided by the former Crown Prince of Jordan Prince Hassan bin Talal, headquartered in Amman, Jordan. The center is dedicated to advancing cooperation between Arab nations and nations around the world, as well as promoting dialogue between intellectual elites and decision makers thru studies, international seminars, and workshops. The center addresses issues related to education, economy, human development and democracy. Ali Oumlil served as its Secretary General for 4 years.

Diplomacy

In 2000, Ali Oumlil was appointed Extraordinary Ambassador Plenipotentiary to the Arab Republic of Egypt by His Majesty King Mohammed VI of Morocco where he served a 4-year term until 2004. During his tenure in Egypt, Oumlil held concurrently the position of the Moroccan Ambassador to the League of Arab States.
Upon the end of his tenure as the Moroccan Ambassador to Egypt, Oumlil was appointed Extraordinary Ambassador Plenipotentiary to the Lebanese Republic where he served from September 2004 to October 2016.

Colloqiums
Oumlil participated in numerous events, including a colloquium organized in 2002 in Cairo, Egypt, under the theme Ali Oumlil and the Arab Political Thought with participants from Egypt, Syria, Lebanon, Tunisia, Jordan, and Morocco.

Writings

In Arabic
 1979 "Al Khitab Al-Tarikh"i (Historic Arab Thought), first edition, Lebanon
 1985 "Al-Islahyya Al-Arabyya Wal-Dawla Al-Watanyya" (Arab Reformism and Nation State), Beirut, Lebanon
 1988 "Atturath wa-l-Tajawuz" (Cultural Legacy and Overtaking)
 1990 "Fi Sharyat Al-Ikhtilaf" (the Notion of Divergence in the Arab Thought), Rabat, Morocco
 1996 "Al Sulta Al Thaqafiya Wal Sulta Al-Syassiya" (Intellectual Authority and Political Power), Beirut, Lebanon
 1998 "Al Fikr al Arabi wal Awlama wal dimoqratya" (Globalization and Democracy in the Arab Thought), Amman, Jordan
 2005 "Suaal Al-Thakafa" (Questioning of Arabic Culture), Beirut, Lebanon
 2013 "Afkar Muhajira" (Migrating Ideas), Beirut, Lebanon
 2016 "Maraya Al- Dhakira" (A narrative), Casablanca, Beirut

In French
1982 "L’Histoire et son Discours", Rabat, Morocco
 1990 "Islam et Etat National" (Islam and National State), Casablanca, Morocco

References

1940 births
Living people
Cairo University alumni
College of Sorbonne alumni
Academic staff of Mohammed V University
Moroccan diplomats
Moroccan philosophers
People from Kenitra